The following is a list of notable Chinese Filipinos (Filipinos of Chinese descent).

 Carlene Aguilar (born 1982), actress, model and beauty queen 
 Emilio Aguinaldo (1869-1964), Filipino revolutionary hero and first president of the Philippines 
 Say Alonzo (born Sheryll Anne Yudatco-Tordillas in 1983), Pinoy Big Brother  Season 1 housemate
 Dante Ang, journalist, the chairman emeritus and owner of The Manila Times
 Ramon S. Ang (born 1954), businessman
 Bam Aquino (born 1977), entrepreneur, politician
 Benigno Aquino III (1960–2021), 15th president of the Philippines
 Corazon Aquino (1933-2009), 11th president of the Philippines and mother of Philippine democracy
 Kris Aquino (born 1971), actress, TV host 
 Ruthlane Uy Asmundson (born 1945), politician
 Arnold Atienza (born 1972), politician, TV host and retired athlete
 Kim Atienza (born 1967), television host, weather anchor and former politician
 Lito Atienza (born 1941), politician
 Julius Babao (born 1968), news anchor, news reporter, broadcaster, journalist
 Harlene Bautista (born 1973), actress and businesswoman
 Herbert Bautista (born 1968), actor, comedian, host, politician
 Kris Bernal (born 1989), actress, dancer, singer
 Tony Tan Caktiong (born 1953), businessman person and founder, ceo, and president of Jollibee Foods Corporation
 Jeffrei Chan (born 1983), basketball player
 Jose Mari Chan (born 1945), singer
 Ken Chan (born 1993), actor
 Gab Chee Kee (born 1976), guitarist of Parokya ni Edgar
 Gec Chia (born 1979), retired basketball player
 Joyce Ching (born 1995), actress and model
 Lyn Ching-Pascual (born 1973), TV host
 Kim Chiu (born 1990), Pinoy Big Brother: Teen Edition 1 Big Winner, actress and singer
 Kriesha Chu (born 1998), singer based in South Korea
 Alfrancis Chua (born 1966), retired basketball player and current team manager of Barangay Ginebra San Miguel
 Brent Chua (born 1985), fashion model
 Karl Chua (born 1978), economist and Socioeconomic Planning Secretary
 Manuel Chua (born 1980), actor and model turned politician
 Tony Chua (1959-2009), retired basketball player and businessman
 Xiao Chua, popular historian
 Dee C. Chuan (1888–1940), businessman
 Michael Cinco, (born 1971), World Class Fashion Designer
 Kean Cipriano (born 1987), actor, dancer and model
 Alfredo Co (born 1949), Sinologist and philosopher
 Atoy Co (born 1951), retired basketball player turned actor
 Eduardo Cojuangco, Jr. (1935-2020), politician and businessman
 Jose Cojuangco, Jr. (born 1934), politician
 Jose Cojuangco, Sr. (1896-1976), politician
 Mark Cojuangco (born 1957), politician
 Mikee Cojuangco-Jaworski (born 1974), equestrienne, model, actress and television host
 Tingting Cojuangco (born 1944), former politician 
 David Consunji (1921-2017), businessman
 Nikki Coseteng  (born 1952), politician
 AJ Dee (born 1982), actor
 Enchong Dee (born 1989), actor, dancer
 Michelle Dee (born 1995), actress, athlete, model, TV presenter, beauty pageant titleholder
 Kisses Delavin (born 1999), Pinoy Big Brother: Lucky 7 2nd Big Placer, model, actress, singer
 Damián Domingo (1796-1834), 19th century painter and headmaster
 Alec Dungo (born 1994), Pinoy Big Brother: Teen Edition 4 housemate
 Rodrigo Duterte (born 1945), 16th Philippine president
 Jason Dy (born 1990), The Voice of the Philippines Season 2 winner and singer
 Luane Dy (born 1986), actress, host and model
 Guillermo Eleazar (born 1965), PNP chief (May 8, 2021)
 Heart Evangelista (born Love Marie Ongpauco in 1985), actress
 Mr. Fu (born 1978) DJ, host, news reporter
 Bong Go (born Christopher Lawrence Go in 1974), senator and former personal aide of President Rodrigo Duterte
 Rachelle Ann Go (born 1986), actress and singer
 Tshomlee Go (born 1981), Taekwondo practitioner
 Betty Go-Belmonte (1933-1994), newspaper publisher
 Eric Go Yap (born 1979), congressman
 John Gokongwei (1926-2019), businessman
 Alodia Gosiengfiao (born 1988), actress, TV host, model, singer and cosplayer
 Yeng Guiao (born 1959), retired basketball player, current head coach of the Rain or Shine Elasto Painters and politician
 Paolo Gumabao (born 1998), actor and model
 Katrina Halili (born 1986), actress, commercial model and businesswoman
 Gretchen Ho (born 1990), television host, model and former volleyball player
 Rhene Imperial (born Renato Chua in 1950), former actor, former movie producer, born-again Christian minister
 Bryan Kong, drummer of Taken by Cars
 Hayden Kho (born 1980), actor, model, public speaker, cosmetic surgeon and entrepreneur
 Yasmien Kurdi (born 1989), actress, singer
 Panfilo Lacson (born 1948), politician, former PNP chief (1999-2001)
Raymond Lauchengco, (born 1964), OPM balladeer singer
 Gilbert Lao (born 1978), basketball player
 Jess Lapid Jr. (born 1962), actor, diving instructor, fight director
 Jess Lapid Sr. (1933-1968),  actor
 Lito Lapid (born 1955), actor, movie director, politician
 Mikee Lee (born 1990), Pinoy Big Brother: Teen Edition 1 2nd Big Placer
 Paul Lee (born 1989), basketball player
 Ricky Lee (born 1948), screenwriter, journalist, novelist, and playwright.
 Ann Li (born 1995), model, photographer, TV personality
 Ronnie Liang (born 1985), singer
 David Licauco, (born 1995) actor and model
 Alberto Lim (born 1959), businessman and former secretary of Department of Tourism under the second Aquino administration
 Alfredo Lim (1929-2020), politician, former police general of Western Police District (WPD) and former National Bureau of Investigation (NBI) director
 Celine Lim, actress and model
 Danilo Lim (1955-2021), former Filipino military officer and chairman of the MMDA 
 Lim Eng Beng (1951-2015), retired basketball player
 Reno Lim (born 1960), politician
 Samboy Lim (born 1962), retired basketball player
 Xian Lim (born 1989), actor, singer and model
 Henry Lim Bon Liong, businessman
 Limahong ( 1574), pirate and warlord
 Vicente Lim (1888-1944) World War II hero
 Mona Lisa (1922-2019), former actress
 Ricky Lo (1946-2021), entertainment journalist, entertainment writer, commentator, TV host
 Angel Locsin (born 1985), model, actress
 Bongbong Marcos (1957), 17th president of the Philippines
 Ferdinand Marcos (1917-1989), 10th president of the Philippines
 Lily Monteverde (born 1938), movie producer of Regal Entertainment, hotelier and businesswoman
 Diether Ocampo (born 1974), actor and model
 Isabel Oli (born 1981), model, actress
 Angelia Ong (born 1990), beauty queen
 Daryl Ong, (born 1987), singer
 Doc Willie Ong, family medicine; politician, cardiologist and medical advisor
 Sergio Osmeña (1878-1961), 4th president of the Philippines
 Champ Lui Pio (born 1982), singer
 Chino Lui Pio (born 1986), model, VJ and host
 Richard Poon (born 1973), singer, enabler
 Miriam Quiambao (born 1975), model, actress, host
 Rodolfo Vera Quizon Sr., (1928-2012), comedian, singer
 Jolo Revilla (born 1988), actor, politician
 Ramon "Bong" Revilla, Jr. (born 1966), actor, movie producer and politician
 Isabel Rivas (born 1958), actress and businesswoman
 José Rizal (1861-1896), Filipino national hero
 Jesse Robredo (1958-2012), politician
 Raul Roco (1941-2005), politician
 Dennis Roldan (born 1956), retired basketball player, actor, businessman, politician
 Lorenzo Ruiz (1600 - 1637), first Filipino saint
 Saweetie (born Diamonte Quiava Valentin Harper in 1993), American rapper, singer and songwriter
 Rufino Santos (1908-1973), former Archbishop of Manila and first Filipino Cardinal
 Romnick Sarmenta (born 1972), actor and businessman
 Beatriz Saw (born 1985), Pinoy Big Brother Season 2 Big Winner and actress
 Homer Se (born 1977), retired basketball player
 Jaime Sin (1928-2005), former Archbishop of Manila and leader of the People Power Revolution of 1986
 Jose Maria Sison (born 1939), founder of Communist Party of the Philippines and National Democratic Front Philippines
 Vicente Yap Sotto (1877-1950), politician
 Vicente Sotto III (born 1948), actor, host, singer and politician
 Vic Sotto (born 1954), actor, host, singer and endorser
 Vico Sotto (born 1989), politician
 Angel Sy (born 2000), child actress, model and singer
 Henry Sy (1924-2019), businessman
 Teresita Sy-Coson (born 1950), businesswoman
 Albino SyCip (born 1887), lawyer and banker
 Washington SyCip (born 1921), accountant 
 Anthony Taberna (born 1975), newscaster
 Luis Antonio Tagle (born 1957), former Archbishop of Manila and former Bishop of Imus
 Andrew Tan (born 1952), businessman person
 Jhoana Marie Tan (born 1993), actress
 Lucio Tan (born 1934), businessman
 Mike Tan (born 1986), StarStruck Season 2 Ultimate Survivor, actor and model
 Milagrosa Tan (1958-2019), politician
 Tony Tan Caktiong (born 1954), businessman and founder of Jollibee Foods Corporation
 Tyrone Tang (born 1984), basketball player
 Siot Tanquingcen (born 1972), retired basketball player and current team manager of Petron Blaze Boosters
 Jeric Teng (born 1991), basketball player
 Jeron Teng (born 1994), basketball player
 Mel Tiangco (born 1955), news anchor and TV host of drama anthology Magpakailanman
 Chris Tiu (born 1985), basketball player, TV host
 JC Tiuseco (born 1985), basketball player, actor, model and 1st Pinoy Sole Survivor, Survivor Philippines
 Alex To (born Alejandro Delfino on 10 February 1962) is a Hong Kong and Taiwan based singer and actor.
 Dennis Trillo (born 1981), actor, model and singer
 Jong Uichico (born 1962), retired basketball player
 Alfonso A. Uy, businessman person
 Dennis Anthony Uy (born 1973), businessman person and founder of Converge ICT
 Ivan John Uy, lawyer and secretary of the Department of Information and Communications Technology under the second Marcos administration
 John James Uy (born 1987), actor and model
 Nicole Uysiuseng (born 1990), Pinoy Big Brother: Teen Edition Plus 3rd Big Placer
 Wilfred Steven Uytengsu, businessman and team owner of Alaska Aces
 Manuel Yan (1920-2008), retired World War II veteran, former Chief of Staff of the Armed Forces of the Philippines under the first Marcos  administration and former cabinet member of the first Aquino, Ramos and Estrada administrations
 Rico Yan (1975-2002), actor and TV host
 Luis Yangco, businessman person
 Cathy Yap-Yang (born 1971), business journalist, talk host, news anchor, reporter, newscaster
 Alfredo Yao (born 1943), businessman
 Arthur Yap (born 1965), politician
 Bimby Yap (born 2007), child actor and model
 Emilio Yap (1925-2014), tycoon and philanthropist, chairman of the Manila Bulletin
 James Yap (born 1982), basketball player
 Richard Yap (born 1967), businessman and actor
 Tim Yap (born 1977), host, writer and businessman
 Ye Fei (1914-1999), Chinese Communist general
 Mark Yee (born 1982), basketball player
 Richard Yee (born 1977), retired basketball player
 Joseph Yeo (born 1983), basketball player
 Slater Young (born 1987), Pinoy Big Brother: Unlimited Big Winner and actor
 Tan Yu, businessman person
 Agatha Wong (born 1998), wushu champion
 Alfonso Yuchengco (1923-2017), businessman and diplomat.
 Jose Yulo (1894-1976), cabinet member under Quezon and the first Marcos administrations
 Dennis Chung
 William Jay Grierson

References